The Wangaratta Magpies Football Club, officially known as the Wangaratta Magpies Football & Netball Club, is an Australian rules football club, which first played in the Ovens and Murray Football League in 1893 and is based in Wangaratta, Victoria at the Wangaratta Showgrounds and play on the Norm Minns Oval.

Club History

On 20 June 1864, the first Wangaratta Football Club in Wangaratta was formed, with Edward Lucas, President, Henry B. K. Leigh as Secretary and Thomas Cusack and seven others as committee. The Wangaratta Football Club was then reformed in Wangaratta, in 1875, when matches were played intermittently against other local towns like – Albury, Beechworth, Benalla, Chiltern, Corowa, Howlong, Rutherglen, Tarrawingee and Wahgunyah.

There were two Wangaratta teams that entered the Ovens & Murray Football League in 1893, Wangaratta Central FC and West End FC (1893 only), with Wangaratta Central (Magpies) remaining in the O&MFA and moving between the Ovens & King Football League on a number of occasions prior to World War Two. These two teams played in the Wangaratta Football Association in 1892, with Wangaratta FC finishing on top of the ladder and winning the premiership. 

In July, 1897, the club withdrew from the O&MFA competition after not winning any matches up until that point.

Wangaratta FC then joined the Murray Valley Junior Football Association and won the 1898 premiership, before rejoining the O&MFA for the 1899 season.

In July, 1900, Collingwood, 12.18 - 90 defeated Wangaratta, 2.8 - 20 in Wangaratta.

Wangaratta FC moved into the Ovens and King FL in its first year of competition in 1903.

Wangaratta's first golden era was between 1919 and 1926 when they played in eight consecutive senior football grand finals, with the first three in the Ovens & King Football League and the last five in the Ovens & Murray Football League, winning an O&KFL premiership in 1920 and an O&MFL premiership in 1925, under coach, Percy Rowe.

In late September 1931, Wangaratta (O&KFL premiers) defeated Weir United (O&MFL Premiers) in a challenge match to decide the champion club in the North East of Victoria. Then in 1932, Wangaratta (O&KFL Premiers) defeated Corowa (O&MFL Premiers) to once again be the North Eastern Victoria champion club.

Wangaratta FC entered two sides into the Ovens & King FL in 1941 and they both played off in the grand final, with the "Rainbows" defeating the more fancied Wangaratta team.

In 1945 Wangaratta entered a team in the Murray Valley Football League and they became undefeated premiers.

Wangaratta FC have been in the Ovens & Murray Football League continuously since 1946. 

Wangaratta's second golden era was between 1945 and 1957 when they won six premierships, and were runners up in 1955, winning a record four consecutive premierships between 1949 and 1952 under their captain / coach, former Collingwood player, Mac Holten.

The club had a very lean period between 1997 and 2002, collecting six consecutive wooden spoons and losing 32 consecutive games between 1997 and 1999, but by the mid 2000s were playing finals and later played in six O&MFNL senior football grand finals between 2007 and 2022, winning four premierships.

Since 2012, the club has fielded three football teams and four netball teams in the Ovens & Murray Football League.

Football competition timeline
Seniors
1892: Wangaratta Football Association
1893–1897: Ovens & Murray Football Association
1898: Murray Valley Junior Football Association
1899–1902: Ovens & Murray Football Association
1903–1914: Ovens & King Football Association
1915: Ovens & Murray Football Association
1916–1918: O&MFA & Club in recess due to World War One
1919–1921: Ovens & King Football Association
1922–1930: Ovens & Murray Football League
1931–1932: Ovens & King Football Association
1933–1940: Ovens & Murray Football League
1941: Ovens & King Football Association
1942–1944: Club in recess due to World War Two
1945: Murray Valley Patriotic Football League
1946–2019: Ovens & Murray Football League
2020: - O&MFL in recess due to COVID-19
2021–2022: Ovens & Murray Football League

Reserves
1930: Ovens & King Football League
1949–1952: Benalla Tungamah Football League
1953–2022: Ovens & Murray Football League

Thirds / Under 18's
1973–2022: Ovens & Murray Football League

Football Premierships
Seniors

Reserves

Thirds

Football League Best & Fairest Award Winners
 Seniors
Ovens & Murray Football League
Morris Medal: 1933 to present day
1933 - Fred Carey
1953 - Tim Lowe
1955 - Ray Preston
1957 - Lance Oswald
1969 - Jeff Hemphill
1975 - Jack O'Halloran
1976 - Jack O'Halloran
2007 - Jonathon McCormick
2010 - Jamie Allan

Reserves
Ovens & Murray Football League
Ralph Marks Medal: 1953 - 1963
Les Cuddon Medal: 1964 - 1975
Leo Burke Medal: 1976 - present day
1963 - Ron Wales
1967 - Alan Benton
1992 - Tony Gleeson
2003 - Colin McClounan
2006, 2007, 2008, 2010, 2011 - Carl Norton

Thirds
Ovens & Murray Football League
3NE Award: 1973 - 1984
Leo Dean Award: 1985 to present day
1974 - Mick Ketchup
2013 - Louis Vescio
2014 - Hugh Amery
2015 - Hugh Amery

Team of the Century

Below is the Wangaratta FNC Team of the Century, that was announced on Saturday evening, 5 August 2006.

Back line: Graeme Nish, Jack Ferguson, Kevin French
Half Backline: Fred Carey, Lionel Wallace, Jack McCormack
Centre line: Des Steele, Alec Fraser, Lance Oswald
Half Forward line: Norm Minns, Ernie Ward, Mac Holten
Forward line: Phil Nolan, John Leary, Bert Carey
Ruck: Bill Comensoli
Ruck Rover: Jack O'Halloran 
Rover: Tim Lowe
Interchange: Graham Wood, Jeffrey Hemphill, Jason Lappin, Kevin Mack, Ken Nish
Coach: Mac Holten
Administration: Norm McGuffie, Jack White

Ovens and Murray Football League - Hall of Fame Inductees
2005 - Norm Minns
2006 - Mac Holten
2010 - Tim Lowe
2013 - Bob Constable
2014 - Kevin Mack
2014 - Phil Nolan
2016 - John Henry
2016 - Jack O'Halloran
2017 - Kevin Allan
2018 - Jack McCormick

VFL / AFL Footballers

The following footballers played for Wangaratta FC prior to making their VFL / AFL debut & / or were drafted to an AFL club, with the year indicating their debut or year drafted.

 1902 - Bill Hickey - South Melbourne
 1906 - Charlie Meadway - Wangaratta
 1912 - Gil Ebbott - St. Kilda
 1926 - Jack Nolan - North Melbourne
 1927 - Dinny Kelleher - Carlton
 1927 - Allan Skehan - Carlton
 1928 - Ray Usher - Melbourne
 1929 - Percy Jones - Geelong
 1930 - Arthur Mills - Hawthorn
 1930 - Bert Mills - Hawthorn
 1932 - John Connell - St. Kilda
 1932 - Leo Nolan - Melbourne
 1950 - Mac Hill - Collingwood
 1953 - Peter Hughes - Hawthorn
 1953 - Lance Oswald - St. Kilda
 1960 - Gary Holmes - St. Kilda
 1960 - Ian Rowland - St. Kilda
 1965 - Ian Montgomery - Collingwood
 1966 - Ian Nicoll - Carlton
 1984 - Darren Steele - North Melbourne
 1988 - Damian Simmonds - Fitzroy
 1989 - Danny Craven - St. Kilda
 1989 - Daniel Frawley - Geelong
 1990 - Chris Naish - Richmond
 1991 - Daryl Donald - Geelong
 1995 - Luke Norman - Melbourne
 2002 - Steve Johnson - Geelong
 2003 - Jonathon McCormick - Carlton
 2007 - Daniel Boyle - Port Adelaide
 2022 - Joe Richards - Collingwood

Most Football Games
Seniors

 300+ - Daine Porter*
 264 - Brett Keir
 260 - Judd Porter
 249 - Ken Nish
 249 - Graham Wood 
 217 - John Leary
 214 - Graeme Nish
 210 - Kevin Mack
 203 - Alec Fraser
 200+ - Matt Kelly*
 200+ -  Chris Crimmins

 - * still playing

Senior Football Honourboard

 - Ladder position is at the end of the home & away series of games
 - # Also won the O&M goal kicking award
 - * Includes goals kicked in finals
 - wins / losses also includes finals, when details checked.

References

Links
1926 - Wangaratta FC Officials
1926 - Wangaratta FC & St. Patrick's FC team photos (June, 1926)
1926 - Ovens & Murray FL Grand Final team photos: Wangaratta FC & St. Patrick's FC (September, 1926)
1929 - Wangaratta FC team photo
1930 - Wangaratta FC & East Albury FC team photos
1931 - Wangaratta FC & Moyhu FC team photos
1933 - Wangaratta FC & Border United FC team photo
1934 - Wangaratta FC & Rutherglen FC team photos
1937 - Wangaratta FC & Corowa FC team photos
1938 - Ovens & Murray FL Grand Final team photos: Wangaratta FC & Yarrawonga FC
1939 - Wangaratta CYMS FC team photo
1941 - Ovens & King FL Premiers: Rainbows FC team photo
1945 - Murray Valley Patriotic Football League Premiers: Wangaratta FC grand final day team photo
1945 - Murray Valley Patriotic Football League Premiers: Wangaratta FC team photo (undefeated)
1969 - O&MFL Grand Final Critic

Ovens & Murray Football League clubs
Australian rules football clubs in Victoria (Australia)
Sport in Wangaratta
1909 establishments in Australia
Australian rules football clubs established in 1909